Beralade is a genus of moths in the family Lasiocampidae first described by Francis Walker in 1855.

Species
Beralade bettoni Aurivillius, 1905
Beralade bistrigata Strand, 1909
Beralade continua Aurivillius, 1905
Beralade convergens Hering, 1932
Beralade curvistriga Hering, 1929
Beralade fulvostriata Pagenstecher, 1903
Beralade gibbonsi Wiltshire, 1947
Beralade jordani Tams, 1936
Beralade niphoessa Strand, 1909
Beralade obliquata Klug, 1830
Beralade pelodes Tams, 1937
Beralade perobliqua Walker, 1855
Beralade pulla Strand, 1909
Beralade pygmula Strand, 1911
Beralade sabrina (Druce, 1900)
Beralade signinervis Strand, 1912
Beralade simplex Aurivillius, 1905
Beralade sobrina Druce, 1900
Beralade sorana Le Cerf, 1922
Beralade unistriga Hering, 1928
Beralade wallengreni (Aurivillius, 1892)

References

Lasiocampidae